The 1913–14 Navy Midshipmen men's basketball team represented the United States Naval Academy during the 1913–14 NCAA Division I college basketball season. Laurence Wild coached the team in his first season as head coach.

Schedule

|-

References

Navy Midshipmen men's basketball seasons
Navy
Navy
Navy